Altarnun and Stoke Climsland is an electoral division of Cornwall in the United Kingdom which returns one member to sit on Cornwall Council. It was created at the 2021 local elections, being formed from the former divisions of Altarnun and Stokeclimsland. The current councillor is Adrian Parsons, a Liberal Democrat.

Extent
Altarnun and Stoke Climsland represents part of the very south west of the town of Launceston (alongside Launceston South), the villages of Fivelanes, Altarnun, Polyphant, Bathpool, Middlewood, North Hill, Coad's Green, Lewannick, South Petherwin, Lawhitton, Lezant, Treburley, Stoke Climsland, and the hamlets of Bolventor, Bowithick, South Carne, Trewint, Treween, Trevadlock, Trebartha, Berriowbridge, Penhole, Newtown, Illand, Congdon's Shop, Trenhorne, Daw's House, Larrick, Little Comfort, Trebullett, Trekenner, Rezare, Goosewell, Venterdon, Pempwell, Old Mill, Luckett, Downgate. The division also covers the outskirts of the village of Kelly Bray, which is represented by Callington and St Dominic. The village of Bray Shop is shared with the Lynher division.

Election results

2021 election

Notes

References

Electoral divisions of Cornwall Council
Launceston, Cornwall